The following television stations broadcast on digital channel 4 in the United States:

 K04BJ-D in La Pine, Oregon, on virtual channel 7, which rebroadcasts KBNZ-LD
 K04DH-D in Gunnison, Colorado, on virtual channel 4
 K04GF-D in Wolf Point, Montana, on virtual channel 18, which rebroadcasts K18BN-D
 K04GT-D in Bullhead City, Arizona, on virtual channel 15, which rebroadcasts KNXV-TV
 K04GW-D in Spearfish, South Dakota, on virtual channel 13, which rebroadcasts KPSD-TV
 K04HF-D in Panaca, Nevada, on virtual channel 13, which rebroadcasts KTNV-TV
 K04HH-D in Aspen, Colorado, on virtual channel 5, which rebroadcasts KREX-TV
 K04IH-D in Baker, Montana, on virtual channel 9, which rebroadcasts KDSE
 K04IJK in Noorvik, Alaska, on virtual channel 4, which rebroadcasts K03GL-D
 K04JF-D in Nulato, Alaska, on virtual channel 4, which rebroadcasts K03GL-D
 K04JH-D in Homer, Alaska, on virtual channel 4, which rebroadcasts KTBY
 K04JZ-D in Gold Hill, Oregon, on virtual channel 10, which rebroadcasts KTVL
 K04KP-D in Northway, Alaska
 K04KV-D in Unalaska, Alaska, on virtual channel 4, which rebroadcasts K03GL-D
 K04LB-D in Pelican, Alaska, on virtual channel 4, which rebroadcasts K03GL-D
 K04LZ-D in Galena, Alaska, on virtual channel 4, which rebroadcasts K03GL-D
 K04MG-D in Wedderburn, etc., Oregon, on virtual channel 10, which rebroadcasts KOPB-TV
 K04MM-D in Hyder, Alaska, on virtual channel 4, which rebroadcasts K03GL-D
 K04MN-D in Wales, Alaska, on virtual channel 4, which rebroadcasts K03GL-D
 K04MR-D in Gustavus, Alaska, on virtual channel 4, which rebroadcasts K03GL-D
 K04MT-D in Newtok, Alaska, on virtual channel 4, which rebroadcasts K03GL-D
 K04NK-D in Dolores, Colorado, on virtual channel 4
 K04ON-D in Weber Canyon, Colorado, on virtual channel 4
 K04OO-D in Ismay Canyon, Colorado, on virtual channel 4
 K04OS-D in Reedsport, Oregon, on virtual channel 9, which rebroadcasts KEZI
 K04PJ-D in Hesperus, Colorado, on virtual channel 12, which rebroadcasts KOBF
 K04QC-D in Palermo, California, on virtual channel 22, which rebroadcasts KZVU-LD
 K04QP-D in Casas Adobes, Arizona, on virtual channel 4, which rebroadcasts KVOA
 K04QR-D in Esparto, California, on virtual channel 38
 K04QV-D in Thompson Falls, Montana, on virtual channel 4, which rebroadcasts K36BW-D
 K04QX-D in Townsend, Montana, on virtual channel 12, which rebroadcasts KTVH-DT
 K04RP-D in Delta Junction, Alaska, on virtual channel 9, which rebroadcasts KUAC-TV
 K04RS-D in Salinas, California, on virtual channel 3, which rebroadcasts KKPM-CD
 K04RT-D in Judith Gap, Montana, on virtual channel 6, which rebroadcasts KSVI
 K04RU-D in Long Valley Junction, Utah, on virtual channel 5, which rebroadcasts KSL-TV
 K04RW-D in Cedar Canyon, Utah, on virtual channel 13, which rebroadcasts KSTU
 K04RX-D in Preston, Idaho, on virtual channel 7, which rebroadcasts KUED
 K04RY-D in Colorado Springs, Colorado, on virtual channel 47
 K04SA-D in Alexandria, Louisiana
 K04SD-D in Victoria, Texas, on virtual channel 4
 K04SE-D in Parker, Arizona
 K04SF-D in Gustine, California
 K41LF-D in Salina & Redmond, Utah, on virtual channel 16, which rebroadcasts KUPX-TV
 K46II-D in Bakersfield, California, on virtual channel 46, which rebroadcasts K23OM-D
 KAHO-LD in Woodville, Texas, on virtual channel 4
 KAKZ-LD in Cathedral City, California, on virtual channel 4
 KBEH in Garden Grove, California, which uses KWHY-TV's spectrum, on virtual channel 63
 KBIS-LD in Turlock, California, on virtual channel 38
 KHDE-LD in Denver, Colorado, moving from channel 50, on virtual channel 51
 KHFW-LD in Dallas, Texas, on virtual channel 35
 KQSL-LD in San Rafael, California, on virtual channel 17, which rebroadcasts KKPM-CD
 KRMF-LD in Reno, Nevada, on virtual channel 7
 KWDA-LD in Dallas, Texas, on virtual channel 30
 KWHY-TV in Los Angeles, California, on virtual channel 22
 W04BS-D in Bethel, Maine, on virtual channel 10, which rebroadcasts WCBB
 W04DN-D in Auburn, Alabama
 W04DW-D in Sylva, etc., North Carolina, on virtual channel 4, which rebroadcasts WYFF
 W04DY-D in Maple Valley, Michigan, on virtual channel 4
 W04DZ-D in Sutton, West Virginia
 W24EI-D in Naranjito, Puerto Rico, on virtual channel 10
 WACP in Atlantic City, New Jersey, on virtual channel 4
 WAUG-LD in Raleigh, North Carolina, on virtual channel 8
 WGCI-LD in Skowhegan, Maine, on virtual channel 2, which rebroadcasts WLBZ
 WHBF-TV in Rock Island, Illinois, on virtual channel 4
 WHDT-LD in Boston, Massachusetts, on virtual channel 3
 WLMA in Lima, Ohio, on virtual channel 44, which rebroadcasts WTLW-LD
 WMDF-LD in Miami, Florida, on virtual channel 3
 WNGH-TV in Chatsworth, Georgia, on virtual channel 18
 WNHT-LD in Alabaster, Alabama, on virtual channel 4
 WOCK-CD in Chicago, Illinois, on virtual channel 13
 WPXO-LD in East Orange, New Jersey, on virtual channel 34
 WQED in Pittsburgh, Pennsylvania, on virtual channel 13
 WTSP (DRT) in Hernando, Florida, on virtual channel 10
 WVDO-LD in Carolina, Puerto Rico, on virtual channel 22
 WWAY-LD in Wilmington, North Carolina

The following stations, which formerly broadcast on digital channel 4, are no longer licensed:
 K04DD-D in Weaverville, California
 K04DS-D in Kenai River, Alaska
 K04GP-D in Alyeska, Alaska
 K04OF-D in Sargents, Colorado
 K04QO-D in Delta Junction, Alaska
 K04RA-D in Clarksville, Arkansas
 K27MK-D in St. George, Utah
 W04AG-D in Garden City, etc., Virginia
 W04DG-D in Birmingham, Alabama

References

04 digital